Bryan Mudryk (born July 13, 1979) is a Canadian sportscaster for TSN. He is a frequent host of SportsCentre and a play-by-play announcer as part of TSN's curling broadcast team. He has been with TSN since October 2005.

Career

Personal life
Mudryk is a cancer survivor, having fought Hodgkin's lymphoma at the age of nineteen. His tournament, the annual Bryan Mudryk Golf Classic, has raised over 1.8 million dollars for the Cross Cancer Institute in Edmonton. The foundation has also launched a special scholarship for post-secondary students undergoing treatment for cancer. For his efforts, Mudryk was a nominee for Canada's Top 40 Under 40 Award.

References

External links
 TSN.ca biography
 Northern Alberta Institute of Technology's techlifemag.ca video segment

Canadian television sportscasters
Curling broadcasters
1979 births
Canadian people of Ukrainian descent
People from Athabasca, Alberta
Living people
Northern Alberta Institute of Technology alumni
Olympic Games broadcasters